Kaleido Star is an anime series created and initially directed by Junichi Sato. Produced by Gonzo, the series aired on TV Tokyo from April 4, 2003 to March 7, 2004.


Episode list

Season 1

Season 2

Kaleido Star